

Events
Chicago Outfit mob boss Alphonse "Al," "Scarface" Capone is sent to the Atlanta Federal Penitentiary after his 1931 conviction for tax evasion. Francesco "Frank 'The Enforcer' Nitti" Nitto succeeds Capone as leader of the Outfit. But, since Capone is in prison, Felice "Paul 'The Waiter" Ricca" DeLucia becomes the real, new Outfit boss. With all of Chicago's organized crime activity consolidated into the Outfit, that organization begins to resemble the modern day National Crime Syndicate. 
Charles "Lucky" Luciano begins employing Louis "Lepke" Buchalter's "The Combination (called Murder, Inc. by the press) for National Crime Syndicate murder contracts.  
Future Gambino crime family leader, Paul Castellano, is brought into the family] by boss Carlo Gambino. 
Sicilian mafiosi Vito Cascio Ferro dies in Rome, Italy while in prison.
February 9 – Renegade hitman Vincent "Mad Dog" Coll is killed in a drive-by shooting at a public telephone booth while attempting to extort money from mob boss Owney "Killer" Madden.
July 29 – Pittsburgh bootleggers John, Arthur, and James Volpe are shot to death in a Pittsburgh coffee shop.  The hits were reportedly ordered by Pittsburgh crime family leader John Bazzano.
August 8 – John Bazzano is found stuffed in a burlap sack on a Brooklyn street  He had been strangled, then stabbed to death. Bazzano's murder may have been connected to the gangland slaying of the Volpe brothers weeks earlier. Vincenzo Capizzi would later succeed Bazzano as head of the Pittsburgh crime family.
September 1 – New York Mayor James J. Walker resigns from office, following his testimony before the Seabury Commission.

Arts and literature
Scarface (film)  starring Paul Muni.

Births
Salvatore Bonanno "Bill", Bonanno crime family member and son of crime family boss Joseph Bonanno.
Frank Imbruglia, East Boston gunman  
Ralph Scopo, Colombo crime family member and Brooklyn labor union racketeer.
Giuseppe Lambeti "Joe", drug trafficker involved in the Pizza Connection and cousin of Salvatore Lamberti 
Salvatore Lamberti, Sicilian mafiosi convicted in the Pizza Connection 
July 28 – Alphonse D'Arco "Little Al", Lucchese crime family acting boss turned government witness.

Deaths
Vito Cascio Ferro, Sicilian mafiosi 
February 9 – Vincent Coll "Mad Dog", New York Prohibition, Irish-American mobster 
March 16 – Antonio Lonzo, New York mobster 
March 16 – Gerard Vernotico, New York mobster 
July 29 – John Volpe, Pittsburgh bootlegger 
July 29 – Arthur Volpe, Pittsburgh bootlegger 
July 29 – James Volpe, Pittsburgh bootlegger 
August 8 – John Bazzano, Pittsburgh crime family leader

Years in organized crime
Organized crime